Hypocalymma serrulatum is a member of the family Myrtaceae endemic to Western Australia.

It blooms between April and May producing white-pink flowers.

It is found along drainage line on the west coast in the Mid West region of Western Australia centred around Dandaragan where it grows in sandy soils.

References

serrulatum
Endemic flora of Western Australia
Rosids of Western Australia
Vulnerable flora of Australia
Plants described in 2002
Taxa named by Gregory John Keighery
Taxa named by Arne Strid